Molyvdoskepastos, known as Depalitsa until 1929, is a village located in the municipality of Konitsa, in the Ioannina regional unit, Epirus, Greece. It has a population of 43 people and is the birthplace of former Greek President Karolos Papoulias.

The village was renamed after the Monastery of Panagia Molyvdoskepastos.

References

Populated places in Ioannina (regional unit)